Alejandra Lazcano (born December 31, 1984) is a Mexican actress, best known for her roles in telenovelas Acorralada and Pobre Diabla.

Biography

Early life
Alejandra started acting in soap operas at a young age.

Her very first role was in the soap opera Señora in 1998, a year later in Catalina y Sebastián, La duda in 2000, and Como En El Cine in 2001.

In 2003 Alejandra had a bigger role in soap opera La hija del jardinero where she played an antagonist for the first time.

Career
Alejandra's first leading role came to her in 2004, in the soap opera Tormenta de pasiones, where her leading man was Alejandro de la Madrid. In 2007 fame came to her through the international recognition of Acorralada, a production of Venevisión Internacional and Univisión where she shared credits with David Zepeda, Sonya Smith, Mariana Torres among others. She played sweet Diana, a young woman with a great heart.

In 2009 Alejandra Lazcano was the protagonist in Valeria again with Venevisión and this time with Jorge Reyes as her leading man.

She returned to Mexico to be the protagonist of the telenovela Pobre Diabla which premiered on July 20, 2009, on TV Azteca. In 2011 she played in Cielo rojo produced by TV Azteca, in a leading role.

Telenovelas

Theatre

External links
 

Mexican television actresses
1984 births
Living people
Mexican expatriates in the United States
Mexican telenovela actresses
Mexican people of Basque descent
People educated at Centro de Estudios y Formación Actoral